In computational complexity theory, the complexity class E is the set of decision problems that can be solved by a deterministic Turing machine in time 2O(n) and is therefore equal to the complexity class DTIME(2O(n)).

E, unlike the similar class EXPTIME, is not closed under polynomial-time many-one reductions.

Relationship to other classes

E is contained by NE.

References 
.
.
.
.
.

External links 

Complexity classes